Holy Trinity Church is a parish church in the Church of England located in Bembridge, Isle of Wight.

Setting 

The church is set in a leafy one-way system, connecting the high street to the Harbour. It is adjacent to the local library (former school-house of the village) and heritage centre. The village war memorial is a short walk up the hill.

History

The church was built in 1845 and 1846.

The first church in Bembridge was built in 1827, but was replaced due to instability by the current building.

Organ

The church has a pipe organ dating from 1884 by Forster and Andrews. A specification of the organ can be found on the National Pipe Organ Register

References

Church of England church buildings on the Isle of Wight
Grade II listed churches on the Isle of Wight
Holy Trinity Church